Kalyani subdivision is an administrative subdivision of the Nadia district in the Indian state of West Bengal.

Overview
Nadia district is part of the large alluvial plain formed by the Ganges-Bhagirathi system. The plains spread southwards from the head of the delta. The Kalyani subdivision has the Bhagirathi on the west, with Hooghly district lying across the river. Topographically, Kalyani subdivision is part of the Ranaghat-Chakdaha Plain, the low-lying area found in the south-eastern part of the district. The area slopes southwards. The area had large forests. The huge influx of East Bengali refugees that took place in the district immediately after the partition of India and the steady influx ever since paved way for conversion of forest into agricultural land.

Subdivisions
Nadia district is divided into the following administrative subdivisions:

Administrative units
Kalyani subdivision has 3 police stations and one police phari under Haringhata P.S., 3 community development blocks, 3 panchayat samitis, 27 gram panchayats, 245 mouzas, 219 inhabited villages 4 municipalities and 13 census towns. The municipalities are: Kalyani, Chakdaha, Haringhata, and Gayespur. The census towns are: Punglia, Darappur, Lalpur, Chanduria, Shimurali, Priyanagar, Jangal, Madanpur, Saguna, Kulia, Simhat, Subarnapur and Digha.

The subdivision has its headquarters at Kalyani.

Police stations
Police stations in Kalyani subdivision have the following features and jurisdiction:

Blocks
Community development blocks in Kalyani subdivision are:

Gram panchayats
The subdivision contains 27 gram panchayats under 3 community development blocks:

Kalyani block consists of 7 gram panchayats, viz. Saguna, Madanpur - 1, Madanpur - 2, Chanduria - 2, Simurali, Kanchrapara, Sarati.

Chakdaha block consists of 10 gram panchayats, viz. Chanduria I, Dewli, Dubra, Ghetugachhi, Hingnara, Silinda I, Silinda II, Tatla I, Tatla II and Rautari

Haringhata block consists of 10 gram panchayats, viz. Birohi–I, Haringhata–I, Kastodanga–II, Nagarukhra–I, Birohi–II, Haringhata–II, Mollabelia, Fatepur, Kastodanga–I and Nagarukhra–lI.

Education
Nadia district had a literacy rate of 74.97% as per the provisional figures of the census of India 2011. Tehatta subdivision had a literacy rate of 67.25%, Krishnanagar Sadar subdivision 71.03%, Ranaghat subdivision 79.51% and Kalyani subdivision 83.35.  

Given in the table below (data in numbers) is a comprehensive picture of the education scenario in Nadia district for the year 2013-14:

Note: Primary schools include junior basic schools; middle schools, high schools and higher secondary schools include madrasahs; technical schools include junior technical schools, junior government polytechnics, industrial technical institutes, industrial training centres, nursing training institutes etc.; technical and professional colleges include engineering colleges, medical colleges, para-medical institutes, management colleges, teachers training and nursing training colleges, law colleges, art colleges, music colleges etc. Special and non-formal education centres include sishu siksha kendras, madhyamik siksha kendras, centres of Rabindra mukta vidyalaya, recognised Sanskrit tols, institutions for the blind and other handicapped persons, Anganwadi centres, reformatory schools etc.

The following institutions are located in Kalyani subdivision:
University of Kalyani, is an affiliating, teaching and research university, established at Kalyani in 1960.
Bidhan Chandra Krishi Viswavidyalaya, an agricultural university, was established at Mohanpur in 1974.
Kalyani Government Engineering College, was established at Kalyani in 1995.
JIS College of Engineering, an autonomous institute, was established at Kalyani in 2000.
Indian Institute of Science Education and Research, an autonomous institute, was established at Mohanpur in 2006.
College of Medicine & JNM Hospital, a medical college, was established at Kalyani in 2009. It is affiliated with West Bengal University of Health Sciences.
Indian Institute of Information Technology, Kalyani, one of the twenty IIITs in the country, was established at Kalyani in 2014.
Kalyani Mahavidyalaya was established at Kalyani in 1999. Affiliated to the University of Kalyani, it offers honours courses in Bengali, English, history, economics, sociology, education, geography, computer science, molecular biology with bio-technology, micro biology, mathematics, chemistry, statistics and accountancy.
Chakdaha College was established at Chakdaha in 1972. Affiliated to the University of Kalyani, it offers honours courses in Bengali, English, Sanskrit, economics, history, political science, geography, physics, chemistry, mathematics, botany, zoology and accountancy.
Haringhata Mahavidyalaya was established at Haringhata in 1986. Affiliated to the University of Kalyani, it offers honours courses in Bengali, English, geography, education, history, political science and accountancy.
Snehansu Kanta Acharya Institute of Law was established at Kalyani in 2004. The institute is named after Snehansu Kanta Acharya, a legal luminary and a Marxist politician.

Healthcare
The table below (all data in numbers) presents an overview of the medical facilities available and patients treated in the hospitals, health centres and sub-centres in 2014 in Nadia district.  
 

.* Excluding nursing homes

Medical facilities
Medical facilities in Kalyani subdivision are as follows:

Hospitals in Kalyani subdivision: (Name, location, beds) ,
All India Institute of Medical Sciences, Kalyani (AIIMS - KALYANI), Basantapur, Saguna, Kalyani, Nadia, West Bengal, India - 741245
Chakdah State General Hospital, Chakdaha, 100 beds
Gandhi Memorial Hospital, Gayespur, 350 beds
Netaji Subhas Sanatorium, Gayespur, 925 beds 
Jawaharlal Nehru Memorial Hospital, Kalyani, 550 beds
E.S.I. Hospital, Kalyani, 266 beds

Rural Hospital and BPHC: (Name, block, location, beds) 
Haringhata Rural Hospital, Haringhata CD Block, Mohanpur, 25 beds

Block Primary Health Centres: (Name, CD block, location, beds)
Chowgacha Block Primary Health Centre, Chakdaha CD Block, Chaugacha, 10 beds

Primary Health Centres (CD Block-wise)(CD Block, PHC location, beds) (CD block-wise)(CD block, PHC location, beds) 
Chakdaha CD Block: Moshra (6 beds), Srinagar (10 beds), Sutargachhi (6 beds)
Haringhata CD Block: Birohi (6 beds), Kastadanga (6 beds), Nagarukhra (10 beds)

Electoral constituencies
Lok Sabha (parliamentary) and Vidhan Sabha (state assembly) constituencies in Kalyani subdivision were as follows:

References

Subdivisions of West Bengal
Subdivisions in Nadia district